Sue Novara-Reber (born November 22, 1955 in Flint, Michigan) is a retired American track cyclist who has won seven medals in the UCI Track Cycling World Championships. She was inducted into the United States Bicycling Hall of Fame in 1991.

References 

Sportspeople from Flint, Michigan
American female cyclists
UCI Track Cycling World Champions (women)
1955 births
Living people
American track cyclists
21st-century American women